Shitten Creek is a stream in Lane County, Oregon, in the United States.

According to one source, Shitten Creek's name may originally have been intended to warn of untreated sewage in the waters.

See also
List of rivers of Oregon

References

Rivers of Lane County, Oregon
Rivers of Oregon